The Azem Alliance is a political party in Iraq. It is headed by the Sunni businessman Khamis al-Khanjar and includes prominent Sunni figures, such as former parliament speakers Mahmoud al-Mashhadani and Salim al-Jabouri, and former defence minister Khaled al-Obaidi.

Electoral results 
They won 14 seats in the 2021 parliamentary election.

References 

Political parties in Iraq